This is a list of Roman Catholic churches in the Philippines.  Roman Catholicism is the most common religion in the Philippines.

Leyte

Tacloban

Metro Manila

See also
List of Anglican churches in the Philippines
List of Philippine Independent Church churches

References

Catholic